The Chief of Staff of People's National Army is the highest position in the Algerian People's National Armed Forces. It was left empty for many years after Chief of Staff Tahar Zbiri attempted a coup against President Houari Boumédiène. 

The current chief of staff is Saïd Chengriha, who has served in the position in an acting capacity since the death of Ahmed Gaid Salah on 23 December 2019.

Chiefs of staff

References

Military of Algeria
Algeria